The Latécoère 3 was a French biplane transport; the 1919 prototype was a two-seater but the unbuilt production version would have carried two or three passengers as well as the pilot.

Design and development

Immediately after the end of World War I, Pierre-Georges Latécoère began his career in aviation by building limousine versions of the Salmson 2 and of the more powerful Breguet 14, both French wartime two seat observation aircraft. The limousines replaced the open rear observer's cockpit with seats for two passengers, enclosed in a hump roofed, windowed cabin. They were known as the Limousine Salmson-Latécoère and the Limousine Breguet-Latécoère and both were used in numbers by the new Lignes aeriennes Latécoère.

By the end of 1919 Latécoère had built a new and original design, which appeared at the Paris Aéro Salon in December of that year. Like the Salmson 2, it was a two bay biplane with unstaggered, equal span, constant chord, fabric covered wings fitted with ailerons on both planes and powered by a water cooled Salmson (Canton-Unné) Z9 nine-cylinder radial engine. However, unlike the Salmson 2 the Latécoère had an entirely metal structure, as well as completely redesigned wings of  greater (9%) span and with a 24% increase in wing area. The Latécoère 3's vertical tail was angular, unlike that of the Salmson though similar to the Limousine Salmson-Latécoère. The intention was to provide the Latécoère 3 with a similar limousine type, two or three seat passenger cabin with space for post to be carried at the rear, though this was never built; the Salon machine had two open cockpits with the pilot in front, as on the unmodified Salsmon.

It is not known if the Latécoère 3 was flown but it did not enter production; the small market for small commercial aircraft at this time was dominated by the large numbers of ex-service aircraft available at low prices and the modified Breguet 14 was too cheap for the Latécoère to compete with.

Specifications

References

1910s French civil aircraft
3